Gholamreza Khoshroo Kuran Kurdieh (December 1, 1965 – August 22, 1997) was an Iranian serial killer known as the "Night Bat".

He began his murder series connected with thefts and rapes in Tehran in 1992. He was arrested, but escaped, before being arrested again in 1997 and executed for 9 murders. In court, he only confessed to a single case of car theft and stolen property, considering the murders to be personal work.

Biography 

On December 1, 1965, Kurdieh was born in Faruj. He got married in Tehran, but following a disturbance, separated from his wife and returned to North Khorasan. He was arrested in 1982 on robbery charges in Nishapur, and was subsequently detained for allegedly spying for Russia.

Kurdieh eventually returned to Tehran, and began his murder spree. While wearing all-black, he stole a taxi. After picking up young girls and women, he would drag them into the wilderness, where he would rape, assault and eventually kill them, burning the bodies afterwards.

He was arrested several times, but repeatedly deceived the authorities by giving them different names. In 1992, after several young girls complained that two men stole their money and raped them, the police launched an extensive investigation.  After several days of pursuit, they arrested the perpetrators after an armed conflict. The two perpetrators, Ali Karimi and Gholamreza Kurdieh, who identified himself as "Murad Naderi", confessed to multiple cases of rape and armed robbery in interrogations.

Gholamreza Kurdieh fled the same year he went to court, but his friend Ali Karimi was hanged in March of that year.

Murders 

 On April 13, 1997, with the discovery of a 54-year-old woman in front of Chitgar Park in Tehran, the police began their criminal investigation to discover the killer.
 On April 16, 1997, a burning corpse was discovered in a garden in Karaj. The coroner diagnosed the cause of death to be knife blows to the neck and chest, and that the burning was caused after death. The body belonged to a woman named A'diah.
 On April 31, 1997, the burning body of a 43-year-old woman was discovered on the road in the construction site of Tehran's Farahzad. Forensics determined the death was the result of a neck rupture.
 On June 2, 1997, a burnt body was discovered in Tehran's Evin District. The cause of death according to the coroners were knife blows to the chest and neck. The victim was 24-year-old Elaha Hematinejad, who went to a hospital in Chamran to see her sister, and died the same night she returned home.
 In May 1997, Tehran policemen discovered two burned bodies on the Bakeri Expressway. According to the coroner, the victims were killed prior to being burned. The older victim, Azam Sabtnzhad, was stabbed 27 times, while her 10-year-old daughter, Munira Qhvhchy, had been strangled. 
 On June 14, 1997, the burned corpse of a female student was discovered in West Tehran. The hands and feet of the victim were broken and the cause of death was burning. The victim was a fifth year student at the Hamadan Dental School.
 On June 30, 1997, the burnt corpse of a 55-year-old woman was discovered on a highway near a construction site in West Tehran.

Arrest 
Gholamreza Khoshroo Kuran Kurdieh was arrested in the Punak area of West Tehran's 10th district on July 22, 1997. After his transfer, it was revealed that he had killed the girls and young women.

At first, his real identity of Kurdieh was not clear, and because of this, he was referred to by his nickname in the press. On a Television broadcast, the police chief of Tehran falsely claimed that the killer was an Afghan citizen. However, when Kurdieh's picture was published in the newspapers, Gholamreza Khoshro, a relative of his, provided a birth certificate to the Iranian newspaper, identifying his relative of Kurdieh.

Kurdieh never confessed to the murders. He claimed that his accomplice, Hamid Rasuli, killed the women.

Meanwhile, Hamid Rasuli, the Interior Ministry's intelligence chief, was sentenced to death for serial murder and issuing orders for two executions of Mr. Dariush Forouhar and Ms. Majdas Kandari. It is likely that Rasuli might have been the Night Bat's accomplice.

Trial 
He was tried by the Tehran General Court in two trial sessions at Imam Khomeini's Judiciary Complex. His trial was one of the most controversial lawsuits in Iran's history, which severely affected the people. He was charged with 9 murders, attempted murder of his youngest niece by placing him in the drawer, escape from the authorities, theft and rape. All stages of the trial, except for the consideration of his actions, were held publicly.

Execution 
On August 22, 1997, he walked down the canopy while writing on the paper: "I am not indebted to anyone, and I am not a creditor and I ask forgiveness for all." And when he received 214 lashes, Kurdieh was hanged in a warehouse near the Azadi Stadium.

See also
List of serial killers by country

References 

1965 births
1997 deaths
20th-century executions by Iran
Executed Iranian serial killers
Iranian people convicted of murder
Iranian rapists
Male serial killers
People executed by Iran by hanging
People executed for rape
People convicted of murder by Iran
People from North Khorasan Province
Violence against women in Iran